"I Wanna Be with You (Part 1)" was a hit song by  R&B/funk group The Isley Brothers. Released from the 1979 double LP, Winner Takes All, it reached number #1 on the U.S. R&B singles chart during the spring of that year.  However, the single did not manage to chart on the Billboard Hot 100.

References
 

1979 singles
The Isley Brothers songs
Songs written by Ronald Isley
Songs written by O'Kelly Isley Jr.
Songs written by Rudolph Isley
T-Neck Records singles